Felicity LaFortune is an American actress and singer from Oak Park, Illinois. She has appeared in numerous theatre productions, including on Broadway, as well as in film and on television, including the daytime soap operas Ryan's Hope and All My Children.

Career
On the daytime soap operas Ryan's Hope, LaFortune had the role of Leigh Kirkland Fenelli (1983–1985, 1988–1989) and in All My Children had the role of Laurel Banning Dillon (1993–1996). In 2000, LaFortune filled in for Hillary B. Smith as Nora Buchanan on One Life to Live while Smith was on leave.

In 1987, LaFortune played the role of the nurse in the Broadway production of the play A Month of Sundays. In 1998, she was a singer in The Harlot's Progress at the Performing Garage in SoHo. In 2006, she appeared again on Broadway in the musical The Light in the Piazza. She also played several characters in the trilogy of plays, The Coast of Utopia, at the Lincoln Center Theater in 2006 and 2007. In 2009, she performed in Deathtrap and The Glass Menagerie on Broadway, followed by I Hate Hamlet in 2010. Her other Broadway appearances include Stevie (standby) in The Goat, or Who Is Sylvia? In 2015, she played the role of Peg in The Outgoing Tide, and was nominated for an IRNE Award for her performance.

Filmography

Film

Television

Theatre - Broadway

References

External links

American soap opera actresses
American television actresses
Actresses from Illinois
Actors from Oak Park, Illinois
1954 births
Living people
Musicians from Oak Park, Illinois
21st-century American women
Broadway theatre people